The Merchants Bridge, officially the Merchants Memorial Mississippi Rail Bridge, is a rail bridge crossing the Mississippi River between St. Louis, Missouri, and Venice, Illinois. The bridge is owned by the Terminal Railroad Association of St. Louis.

The bridge was originally built by the St. Louis Merchants Exchange after it lost control of the Eads Bridge it had built to the Terminal Railroad. The Exchange feared a Terminal Railroad monopoly on the bridges but it would eventually lose control of the Merchants Bridge also.

In 2018 work began on an extensive renovation of the bridge projected to cost $172 million. In September 2022 the Terminal Railroad completed the large reconstruction project, doubling the bridge's capacity from roughly 32 trains per day to 70 trains per day. Prior to the reconstruction, only one train, traveling at 5 miles per hour, could cross the bridge at a time. The final cost of the project was $222 million.

See also
List of crossings of the Upper Mississippi River

References

Railroad bridges in Missouri
Bridges over the Mississippi River
Metro East
Bridges completed in 1889
Bridges in St. Louis
Steel bridges in the United States
Interstate vehicle bridges in the United States